The Detroit Vipers were an International Hockey League team. The team was founded in 1994, and played at The Palace of Auburn Hills. Their mascot was a polar bear named Vipe-bear.

History

Beginning
The Vipers were originally formed as the Salt Lake Golden Eagles in 1969. In 1994, the franchise was purchased by Palace Sports and Entertainment (owners of the Detroit Pistons and the Palace of Auburn Hills) and relocated for the 1994–95 season. A sponsorship deal with the Chrysler Corporation led to the naming of the team after their Dodge Viper, although the team's logo primarily featured a common Viperidae (a venomous snake). A similar deal was in place with another Palace Sports-owned team, the Detroit Neon of the Continental Indoor Soccer League, which switched its sponsorship to GMC in its final year and renamed the team the Detroit Safari after yet another vehicle, the Safari.

The team hired former Buffalo Sabres coach Rick Dudley as head coach. Their first season was during the NHL lockout, and this, combined with a liberal amount of free ticket vouchers distributed at local stores, helped the Vipers break IHL attendance records that season with nearly 17,000 per game on average. On December 1, the Vipers took on the Ninety-Nines, an all-star team of locked-out NHL players led by Wayne Gretzky. The Vipers won, 4–3, with future NHL star Miroslav Satan scoring the winning goal for Detroit. (Three Detroit Red Wings players, Steve Yzerman, Sergei Fedorov, and Paul Coffey, did not appear in this game.) Led by a franchise-record 44 goals from Daniel Shank, the Vipers won the IHL's Central Division but were eliminated by the Kansas City Blades in five games in the first round of the playoffs. 

The 1995–96 season saw the notable signing of Washington Capitals star Peter Bondra for a brief time, while he was locked in a holdout with Washington management, as well as the departure of Rick Dudley to take the general manager's position with the Ottawa Senators, replaced by assistant coach Steve Ludzik for the final 32 games. The Vipers finished the season in second place in the Central Division and led the league in attendance again. In the first round of the playoffs, they defeated the Indianapolis Ice in five games, but the Vipers lost their second round playoff series to the Orlando Solar Bears in seven games.

The Turner Cup Finals
1996–97 saw the arrival of Russian phenom Sergei Samsonov and IHL All-Star Stan Drulia to the Vipers. Drulia led the team in scoring and Samsonov would win Rookie of the Year honors as the Vipers won another division title. Detroit would advance to their first Turner Cup Final, against the Long Beach Ice Dogs. Led by Samsonov and Peter Ciavaglia, the Vipers won the series four games to two for their first Turner Cup. That championship allowed the city of Detroit to be the first city to capture two cups in the same season as the Detroit Red Wings won the 
Stanley Cup. Samsonov would be a high first round draft pick of the Boston Bruins, but the slack was picked up in 1997–98 by 40 goals from Dan Kesa as the Vipers won their third division title in four years. They would advance to the Turner Cup Finals against the Chicago Wolves, but after going up three games to two, would only be able to score one goal in the final two games and lost four games to three. 1997–98 also saw a one-shift comeback from Gordie Howe, making him the only person to play hockey in six different decades as a professional.

Demise
The 1998–99 season saw another division title for the Vipers and they became the first team in professional hockey to have 100 points in the standings in each of their first five years. However, they were defeated in the Eastern Conference Finals by the Solar Bears in seven games, after a questionable call by referee Matt Pilgrim. In 1999, Palace Sports and Entertainment purchased the Tampa Bay Lightning and made the Detroit Vipers their top farm club. Vipers coach Steve Ludzik was moved to Tampa Bay as part of Palace's effort to rebuild the struggling NHL club. Paulin Bordeleau took over as Vipers coach.

The Lightning remained barely competitive, prompting a mass transfer of talent from Detroit to Tampa throughout the season. This drained the Vipers of the strength and stability that they had experienced through the first five years of their existence. It also led to a swift, sudden and near-total collapse; the Vipers plummeted from the second-best record a year earlier to dead last in the league.

The Vipers' woes were nothing, however, compared to the worsening health of the IHL. The league had overexpanded itself throughout the decade, and was paying the price in red ink. Additionally, strained relations with the NHL cost a number of IHL teams their NHL affiliations–and with it, their subsidized salaries. By the start of the 2000–01 season, the Vipers were one of only four IHL teams affiliated with NHL teams. That season saw the Vipers finish dead last in the league in standings and attendance. The impending demise of the IHL, combined with the plummeting attendance led Palace Sports to find a new affiliate for the Lightning. On June 4, 2001, both the International Hockey League and the Detroit Vipers ceased operations.

Front office and player personnel
The Vipers were owned by William Davidson, a Detroit businessman with an estimated net worth of $3.5 billion with holdings under the banner of Palace Sports and Entertainment.  Davidson holdings included the Detroit Pistons and the Detroit Neon. With Robert Sosnick and David Hermelin, his partners in Arena Associates, he co-owned DTE Energy Music Theater and the Palace of Auburn Hills (the Pistons and Vipers home arena). Davidson would later add or purchase the Detroit Fury, Detroit Shock, and the Tampa Bay Lightning. The CEO of Palace Sports and Entertainment, Tom Wilson, oversaw the daily business operations of the Vipers.

The Vipers were aggressive in marketing and player acquisitions. The team acquired minor league free agents with prior success in the AHL/IHL, including Peter Ciavaglia, Stan Drulia, Lonnie Loach and Daniel Shank. The Vipers also made hockey headlines by signing star NHL players in the midst of contract holdouts, such as Peter Bondra and Michal Pivonka of the Washington Capitals in 1995–96, and Bryan Smolinski of the Pittsburgh Penguins in 1996–97.

The Vipers also served as a launching site for young Eastern European players looking to adjust to the NHL-style game, which involved a slightly smaller rink and more aggressive play. These players included Petr Sykora, Stan Neckar, Miroslav Satan, Krysztof Oliwa and Sergei Samsonov. Samsonov in particular was a popular player who made his Vipers debut in 1996 at age 17, and was widely regarded as a phenom. He was drafted off the Vipers by the Boston Bruins following the season as the eighth pick of the first round of the 1997 NHL Entry Draft and would win the Calder Memorial Trophy as the NHL's best rookie in 1997–98.

Veteran NHL players concluded their playing career with the Vipers, including Dan Quinn, Gerard Gallant, Brad Shaw, Brent Fedyk, Jimmy Carson, Michel Petit and Shawn Burr.

The Vipers made headlines in 1997–98 by signing Hockey Hall of Fame winger Gordie Howe to a one-day contract. Howe, 69 years old at the time of the game, suited up for the Vipers and played one shift.  The publicity stunt was intended to drum up interest in the club as well as afford Howe the opportunity to play a professional hockey game in six consecutive decades.

In 1999, Davidson purchased the Tampa Bay Lightning of the National Hockey League. The Vipers were named as an affiliate of the Lightning and served as such until the league ceased operations in 2001.

Players
Peter Bondra
Phil Bourque
Jimmy Carson
Dan Cloutier
Stan Drulia
Gerard Gallant
Ian Herbers
Johan Hedberg
Gordie Howe
Dan Kesa
Michal Pivonka
Sami Salo
Sergei Samsonov
Miroslav Satan
Bryan Smolinski
Petr Sykora
Tim Thomas
Kevin Weekes

Affiliates
 Ottawa Senators (1997-1998)
 Tampa Bay Lightning (1999-2001)

References

External links
Detroit Vipers statistics at Hockey Database

Professional ice hockey teams in Michigan
Ice hockey clubs established in 1994
International Hockey League (1945–2001) teams
V
Sports in Auburn Hills, Michigan
Sports clubs disestablished in 2001
Defunct ice hockey teams in the United States
Sports in Oakland County, Michigan
Ottawa Senators minor league affiliates
Tampa Bay Lightning minor league affiliates
1994 establishments in Michigan
2001 disestablishments in Michigan